Lyle W. Hillyard (born September 25, 1940) is a Utah politician and an attorney. A Republican, he was a member of the Utah State Senate, representing the state's 25th senate district in Cache and Rich Counties including the city of Logan. He served in the legislature from 1981 to 2020, first as a representative from 1981 to 1984, then as a senator from 1985 to 2020.

Early life, education, and career
Hillyard is a graduate of North Cache High School and Utah State University. He also got his J.D. from the University of Utah College of Law. Hillyard is a lawyer by profession. He works at Hillyard, Anderson & Olsen law offices, which has been providing legal representation to clients across northern Utah since the 1960s.

Hillyard is married to his wife Alice and they have 5 Children: Carrie, Holly, Lisa, Matt, and Todd. Hillyard is a member of the Church of Jesus Christ of Latter-day Saints.

Background
Cache Chamber of Commerce (past president) 
Cache County Republican Party (Chair) 
Utah Education Strategic Planning Commission 
Utah State Office of Education (vice chair) 
Utah Highway Patrol (Honorary Colonels ) 
ALEC voted one of eight outstanding state legislators

Political career

Senator Hillyard was first elected to the House in 1980. He was elected to the Senate in 1984 and has served there since. He won the 2012 American Cancer Society Legislator of the Year, the most effective Republican freshman by the Utah House in 1981 and was named one of eight outstanding legislators by ALEC in 1987. Hillyard is currently the Executive Appropriations Committee Chair and has been since 2009.

In 2016, Senator Hillyard served on the following committees: 
Executive Appropriations Committee (Senate Chair)
Infrastructure and General Government Appropriations Subcommittee
Public Education Appropriations Subcommittee
Senate Government Operations and Political Subdivisions Committee
Senate Judiciary, Law Enforcement, and Criminal Justice Committee

Election 
Senator Hillyard was up for reelection in 2020 and lost against Chris Wilson in the Republican Primary.

Legislation

2016 sponsored bills

Notable legislation 
In 2014, Senator Hillyard Sponsored S.B. 205 Controlled Substance Penalty Amendment, which made it so that in certain circumstances, those with illegal substances would not be charged with anything more than a second degree felony. This encourages people who are using illegal substances to call 911 if someone with them overdoses or gets hurt without the fear of getting in trouble.

References

1940 births
Living people
Utah State University alumni
University of Utah alumni
Latter Day Saints from Utah
Republican Party Utah state senators
Politicians from Logan, Utah
21st-century American politicians